"Disco Duck" is a satirical disco novelty song performed by Rick Dees and His Cast of Idiots. At the time, Dees was a Memphis disc jockey. It became a number-one hit on the Billboard Hot 100 for one week in October 1976 (and ranked #97 out of the 100 most popular songs of the year according to Billboard magazine). It also made the top 20 on the Billboard Hot Soul Singles chart, peaking at number 15. "Disco Duck" was initially released in the south by Estelle Axton's Fretone label, but it was later released by RSO Records for national and international distribution. The song earned a 1977 People's Choice Award for Favorite New Song.

Origin and storyline
Written by Dees, "Disco Duck" was inspired by a 1960s novelty dance song called "The Duck", recorded by Jackie Lee (Earl Lee Nelson) in 1965. According to Dees, it took one day to write the song, but three months to convince anyone to perform it.

Combining orchestral disco styles with a Donald Duck-esque voice as the main plot point, the story within "Disco Duck" centers on a man at a dance party who is overcome by the urge to get up and "get down" in a duck-like manner. When the music stops, he sits down, but when he decides to get up and dance again, he finds that everyone in the room is now doing his dance.

Duck voice

A misconception about "Disco Duck" is that the voice of the duck was provided by Clarence Nash, the original voice of Donald Duck in many Walt Disney cartoons, but on several occasions the Disney Company maintained that Nash never contributed to the record. The voice of the duck was performed by Ken Pruitt, an acquaintance of Dees, as stated on the label of the RSO release. For the live tour, the duck vocals were handled by Michael Chesney, another acquaintance of Dees.

In fact, the voice emulates that of Yakky Doodle, a Hanna-Barbera animated duck who appeared on TV in 1960 and 1961 and was still seen regularly on afternoon TV cartoon shows in the late 1970s. He even parodies Yakky's signature phrase, "Are you my mama?", saying "I've got to have me a mama!"

Response and impact
"Disco Duck" became a nationwide hit in the United States by September 1976. On the Billboard Hot 100 singles chart, it peaked at number one on October 16, 1976, for one week, held the number-two spot for the following four weeks and remained in the Top 10 for a total of 10 weeks. The single sold over 4 million copies and won a People's Choice Award.

For all its success, "Disco Duck" got very little airplay in Memphis, including at WMPS, the station Dees worked for at the time; Dees was forbidden by station management to play the record on his own show, and rival stations refused to play it for fear of promoting the competition. When Dees merely mentioned the song on his show one morning, WMPS management fired him citing conflict of interest. After a brief mandatory hiatus, Dees was hired on at WMPS' primary competition, WHBQ, who gave him permission to play his song.

By the time "Disco Duck" had become a hit, Dees and his "Idiots" started making the rounds of the popular TV music shows to promote the record. On American Bandstand (and similar shows), Dees lip-synched to the recording, alone on stage with puppeteer Rickey Provow animating a duck puppet that he had made. This appearance was never seen in the Memphis area due to then-ABC affiliate WHBQ-TV pre-empting Bandstand for wrestling at the time and for the aforementioned Memphis radio avoidance reasons. But when Dees appeared on The Midnight Special and went on  a live tour along the East Coast, he hired a band, backing singers and a commercial artist, Michael Chesney, to perform the duck vocals, and they did everything live.

"Disco Duck" made an appearance in the film Saturday Night Fever, in a dance club scene in which a group of senior citizens were learning to dance disco-style. It was also featured in a deleted scene added to the PG-rated version. As it stands, Dees could have made an even more substantial amount of money from the song. According to Dees, his manager at the time made the extremely unwise decision to deny use of the song on the film's soundtrack album because of fears that it would compete with sales of Dees's own record. The Saturday Night Fever soundtrack has now currently sold 40 million copies worldwide, and is the second best-selling soundtrack of all time.

Irwin the Disco Duck, also called Irwin the Dynamic Duck, a fictional character who was featured on a series of children's records from Peter Pan Records, was inspired by this record.

Chart performance

Weekly charts

Year-end charts

All-time charts

Certifications

References

External links
 

1976 singles
1976 songs
Rick Dees songs
Billboard Hot 100 number-one singles
Cashbox number-one singles
RPM Top Singles number-one singles
Disco songs
Novelty songs
RSO Records singles
Songs about disco
Fictional ducks
Songs about dancing
Song recordings produced by Bobby Manuel